Niels Van Zandweghe (born 28 February 1996) is a Belgian competitive rower, born in Bruges. He competed at the 2020 Summer Olympics in Tokyo 2021, in men's lightweight double sculls.

References

External links

 

1996 births
Living people
Sportspeople from Bruges
Belgian male rowers
Rowers at the 2020 Summer Olympics
Olympic rowers of Belgium
Rowers at the 2014 Summer Youth Olympics
21st-century Belgian people